Desmond Drummer (27 July 1940 – 19 March 2013) was a South African cricketer. He played seven first-class matches for Western Province between 1960 and 1964.

References

External links
 

1940 births
2013 deaths
South African cricketers
Western Province cricketers
Cricketers from Cape Town